Onur Seyit Yaran (born 13 January 1995, Istanbul) is a Turkish TV series actor and former model.

Life and career
Onur Seyit Yaran was born on January 13, 1995, in Istanbul. Best Model of Turkey 2016 winner. He represented Turkey in the Best Model of World competition after the he best Model of Turkey competition.

He started acting with the family comedy series Kalk Gidelim. He has guest role in youth series "Hayat Bazen Tatlıdır". He played in Vuslat. 

He is currently playing the leading role in the youth series Kardeşlerim. On December 16, 2021, He won the Rising TV Star of the Year Award at the GQ Men Of The Year Awards Ceremony. He won an award in the category of "Best TV Series Couple" with Su Burcu Yazgı Coşkun at the Golden Butterfly Award Ceremony on December 4, 2022.

Filmography

Awards and nominations

References

External links 

 
 
 

Living people
1995 births
Turkish male models
Turkish male actors
Male actors from Istanbul
Turkish male film actors
Turkish male television actors
21st-century Turkish male actors
Golden Butterfly Award winners